Terry French may refer to:
 Terry French (politician)
 Terry French (chef)